SIPP may refer to:

 Self-invested personal pension, a type of United Kingdom pension plan
 Simple Internet Protocol Plus, former name of IPv6
 SIPP memory, single in-line pin package, a type of computer memory
 Standard Interline Passenger Procedure, ACRISS vehicle category codes
 Survey of Income and Program Participation, a survey of household income and transfer payments
 SIPp, test tool / traffic generator for Session Initiation Protocol
 "The Sipp" or Sipp, shortened form of Mississippi, a state of the United States of America 
 Stable Image Platform Program initiative from Intel